Karim Ghellab ( – born 14 December 1966, Casablanca, Morocco) is a Moroccan politician and current president of the Assembly of Representatives of Morocco. Between 2002 and 2011, he was Minister of Transportation and Equipment under the governments of Driss Jettou and Abbas El Fassi.

See also
Istiqlal Party

References

People from Casablanca
Moroccan engineers
Istiqlal Party politicians
Living people
1966 births
Presidents of the House of Representatives (Morocco)